March 9 - Eastern Orthodox liturgical calendar - March 11

All fixed commemorations below are observed on March 23 by Eastern Orthodox Churches on the Old Calendar.

For March 10th, Orthodox Churches on the Old Calendar commemorate the Saints listed on February 25 (February 26 on leap years).

Saints

 Martyr Codratus (Quadratus), and with him Martyrs Cyprian, Dionysius, Anectus, Paul, Crescens, and Dionysius (another), at Corinth (251)
 Martyrs Victorinus, Victor, Nicephorus, Claudius, Diodorus, Serapion, Papias, and others, at Corinth (251 or 258)  (see also: January 31)
 Martyrs Codratus, Saturninus, and Rufinus, of Nicomedia (250-259)  (see also: March 7)
 Martyr Marcian, by scourging.
 Saint Anastasia the Patrician, of Alexandria (567)
 Saint George Arselaites (6th century)
 Venerable Agathon, ascetic at the Monastery of St Symeon near Aleppo in Syria, reposed in peace.

Pre-Schism Western saints

 Martyr Victor, in North Africa under Decius.
 Saint Silvester (Sylvester), a companion of St Palladius in enlightening Ireland (c. 420)
 Saint Simplicius, Pope of Rome (468-483), who upheld the decisions of the Council of Chalcedon against Monophysitism, and dealt with the Arian King Odoacer after the Fall of the Western Roman Empire in 476 (483)
 Saint Droctoveus (Drotté), a disciple of St Germanus of Paris (c. 580)
 Saint Kessog (Mackessog), an Irish missionary of the mid-sixth century active in the Lennox area and southern Perthshire (c. 560)
 Saint Sedna (Sétna, Sidonius), Bishop of Ossory in Ireland and a friend of St Luanus (c. 570)
 Saint Attalus (Attala), Abbot of Bobbio Abbey (626)
 Saint Himelin, an Irish or Scottish priest who, returning from a pilgrimage to Rome, fell ill when passing through Vissenaken (c. 750)
 Saint Emilian (Eminian), born in Ireland, he became a monk and then Abbot of Lagny (Abbaye Saint-Pierre de Lagny) in France (675)
 Saint Failbhe the Little (Fáilbe mac Pípáin), Abbot of Iona in Scotland, where he reposed at the age of eighty (754)

Post-Schism Orthodox saints

 Venerable John of Khakhuli Monastery, Georgia, called Chrysostom, reposed on Mount Athos (10th-11th century)
 New Martyr Michael of Agrapha (Michael of Soluneia), at Thessalonica (1544 or 1547)  (see also: March 21)
 Saint Paul of Taganrog (Pavel of Taganrog) (1879) 
 Saint Alexander (Badanin), Priest, of Vologda (1913)

New martyrs and confessors

 New Hieromartyr Demetrius Legeydo, Priest (1938)

Other commemorations

 Commemoration of the Desert-dwellers of the Roslavl Forests near Bryansk.

Icon gallery

Notes

References

Sources
 March 10/March 23. Orthodox Calendar (PRAVOSLAVIE.RU).
 March 23 / March 10. HOLY TRINITY RUSSIAN ORTHODOX CHURCH (A parish of the Patriarchate of Moscow).
 March 10. OCA - The Lives of the Saints.
 The Autonomous Orthodox Metropolia of Western Europe and the Americas (ROCOR). St. Hilarion Calendar of Saints for the year of our Lord 2004. St. Hilarion Press (Austin, TX). pp. 20–21.
 March 10. Latin Saints of the Orthodox Patriarchate of Rome.
 The Roman Martyrology. Transl. by the Archbishop of Baltimore. Last Edition, According to the Copy Printed at Rome in 1914. Revised Edition, with the Imprimatur of His Eminence Cardinal Gibbons. Baltimore: John Murphy Company, 1916. pp. 71–72.
Greek Sources
 Great Synaxaristes:  10 ΜΑΡΤΙΟΥ. ΜΕΓΑΣ ΣΥΝΑΞΑΡΙΣΤΗΣ.
  Συναξαριστής. 10 Μαρτίου. ECCLESIA.GR. (H ΕΚΚΛΗΣΙΑ ΤΗΣ ΕΛΛΑΔΟΣ).
Russian Sources
  23 марта (10 марта). Православная Энциклопедия под редакцией Патриарха Московского и всея Руси Кирилла (электронная версия). (Orthodox Encyclopedia - Pravenc.ru).
  10 марта (ст.ст.) 23 марта 2013 (нов. ст.). Русская Православная Церковь Отдел внешних церковных связей. (DECR).

March in the Eastern Orthodox calendar